Galvanism is a term invented by the late 18th-century physicist and chemist Alessandro Volta to refer to the generation of electric current by chemical action. The term also came to refer to the discoveries of its namesake, Luigi Galvani, specifically the generation of electric current within biological organisms and the contraction/convulsion of biological muscle tissue upon contact with electric current. While Volta theorized and later demonstrated the phenomenon of his "Galvanism" to be replicable with otherwise inert materials, Galvani thought his discovery to be a confirmation of the existence of "animal electricity," a vital force which gave life to organic matter.

History
According to popular legend, Luigi Galvani discovered the effects of electricity on muscle tissue when investigating an unrelated phenomenon which required skinned frogs in the 1780s and 1790s. His assistant is claimed to have accidentally touched a scalpel to the sciatic nerve of the frog and this resulted in a spark and animation of its legs. Galvani was investigating the effects of distant atmospheric electricity (lightning) on prepared frog legs when he discovered the legs convulsed not only when lightning struck but also when he pressed the brass hooks attached to the frog's spinal cord to the iron railing they were suspended from. In his laboratory, Galvani later discovered that he could replicate this phenomenon by touching metal electrodes of brass connected to the frog's spinal cord to an iron plate. He concluded that this was proof of "animal electricity," the electric power which animated living things.

Alessandro Volta, a contemporary physicist, believed that the effect was explicable not by any vital force but rather it was the presence of two different metals that was generating the electricity. Volta demonstrated his theory by creating the first chemical electric battery. Despite their differences in opinion, Volta named the phenomenon of the chemical generation of electricity "Galvanism" after Galvani.

On March 27, 1791, Galvani published a book about his work on animal electricity. It contained comprehensive details of his 11 years of research and experimentation on the topic.

The 1797 edition of Gren’s Grundriss der Naturlehre provides the first explicit definition of 'galvanism' as clearly reflecting Volta’s opinion in the following terms: 
“Galvani from Bologna was the first to observe muscular motions elicited by the contact between two different metals; after him, the phenomena of this sort were termed and included under the name of Galvanism” .
Giovanni Aldini, Galvani's nephew, continued his uncle's work after Luigi Galvani died in 1798. In 1803, Aldini performed a famous public demonstration of the electro-stimulation technique of deceased limbs on the corpse of an executed criminal George Foster at Newgate in London. The Newgate Calendar describes what happened when the galvanic process was used on the body:

Galvani has been called the father of electrophysiology. The debate between Galvani and Volta "would result in the creation of electrophysiology, electromagnetism, electrochemistry and the electric battery."

Scientific and intellectual legacy

Literature
Mary Shelley's Frankenstein, wherein a man stitches together a human body from corpses and brings it to life, was inspired in part by the theory and demonstrations of Galvanism which may have been conducted by James Lind. Although the Creature was described in later works as a composite of whole body parts grafted together from cadavers and reanimated by the use of electricity, this description is not consistent with Shelley's work; both the use of electricity and the cobbled-together image of Frankenstein's monster were more the result of James Whale's popular 1931 film adaptation of the story.

Abiogenesis
Galvanism influenced metaphysical thought in the domain of abiogenesis, the underlying process of the generation of living forms. In 1836, Andrew Crosse recorded what he referred to as "the perfect insect, standing erect on a few bristles which formed its tail," as having appeared during an experiment wherein he used electricity to produce mineral crystals. While Crosse himself never claimed to have generated the insects, even in private, the scientific world at the time viewed the connection between life and electricity to be sufficiently clear that he received threats against his life for this "blasphemy."

Medicine
Galvani's nephew, Giovanni Aldini, is claimed to have applied Galvanic principles (application of electricity to biological organisms) in successfully alleviating the symptoms of "several cases of insanity", and with "complete success". Today, electroconvulsive therapy is used as a treatment option for severely depressed pregnant mothers (as it is the least harmful for the developing fetus) and people suffering treatment-resistant major depressive disorder. It is found to be effective for half of those who receive treatment while the other half may relapse within 12 months.

The modern application of electricity to the human body for medical diagnostics and treatments is practiced under the term electrophysiology. This includes the monitoring of the electric activity of the heart, muscles, and even the brain, respectively termed electrocardiography, electromyography, and electrocorticography.

See also
 Electrohomeopathy
 Bioelectromagnetics
 Electrotherapy
 Electrotherapy (cosmetic)
 Hallerian physiology, for a counter-theory to Galvanism

References

External links 

 The history of galvanism

Electrochemistry
Muscular system